Delele is a Zimbabwean, Zambian, north-eastern Botswana and Northern South African dish made from a local plant of the same name, and often eaten with sadza or phaletšhe or Vhuswa. The English word for delele is okra. Okra is also referred to as "derere". It is prepared with baking soda and well known for its slimy texture. Delele can be dried before cooking, but more frequently it is cooked fresh.

The Vha-Venda people of South Africa cook the leaves of Corchorus olitorius in a similar manner. The dish goes well with vhuswa (pap or maize meal).

Description 
Okra is a herbaceous, hairy annual plant of the mallow family (Malvaceae) and it is an edible food.

Nutritional value 
Essential nutrients are necessary for health living and are required for various biochemical and physiological processes in the body. Vitamins, enzymes, minerals and amino acids are components which the body need in order to function properly. Okra fruit is an excellent source of vitamin C.  The leaves such as bush okra leaves contain less amount of vitamin C and as such must be supplemented. 

Bush okra leaves such as delele contains a high amount of collagen,  needed for structural composition of the human body, especially tissue maintenance and healing. Skin tissue, muscle tissue and other organs needs foods or supplements rich in the sulphur compound (MSM) found in collagen or simply raw MSM, which is a natural edible salt. A close match is aloe vera slime or gel. The chemical composition of bush okra vary slightly to that of aloe vera gel in respect to amounts of vitamins, enzymes, minerals and amino acids.

Bush okra has a variety of species and which can be readily available as food source and if used for the purpose of its healing and skin benefits can be a sufficient and cheaper source of collagen. Vitamin C is needed for collagen compounds to be assimilated by the body. 
Okra, raw
Nutritional value per 100 g (3.5 oz)
Energy
138 kJ (33 kcal)
Carbohydrates
7.46 g
Sugars
1.48 g
Dietary fibre
3.3 g
Fat
0.19 g
Protein
1.9 g
Vitamins
Quantity%DV†
Vitamin A equiv.
5%36 μg
Thiamine (B1)
17%0.2 mg
Riboflavin (B2)
5%0.06 mg
Niacin (B3)
7%1 mg
Folate (B9)
15%60 μg
Vitamin C
28%23 mg
Vitamin E
2%0.27 mg
Vitamin K
30%31.3 μg
Minerals
Quantity%DV†
Calcium
8%82 mg
Iron
5%0.62 mg
Magnesium
16%57 mg
Phosphorus
9%61 mg
Potassium
6%299 mg
Zinc
6%0.58 mg
Other constituents
Quantity
Water
89.6 g

.

See also
 List of African dishes

References

Zambian cuisine